Pleasantdale is an unincorporated community in Campbell County, Wyoming, United States.

Etymology

The name "Pleasantdale" is thought to be a spin-off of the nearby and older town of "Savageton" to make the town sound more attractive than its neighbor.

References

Unincorporated communities in Wyoming
Unincorporated communities in Campbell County, Wyoming